Mount Huanggang is the highest peak in the UNESCO designated Wuyi Mountains, China. It separates and is the highest point of both Fujian and Jiangxi provinces.

References

External links
 Geographic data related to Mount Huanggang on OpenStreetMap

Highest points of Chinese provinces
Tourist attractions in Fujian
Tourist attractions in Jiangxi